The Nations Cup 1971-72 was the 12th edition of a European rugby union championship for national teams, and seventh with the formula and the name of "Nations Cup".

The tournament was won by France, who swept all their matches.

First division 
 Table

Czechoslovakia relegated to division 2

Results

 Historical note: Valeriu Irimescu score, almost surely, the last goal from mark scored in an International match.

Second Division  

 Semifinals

 Aggregate; Italy 15 - Portugal 7

 Aggregate; Spain 47 - Yugoslavia 11
 Final

 Aggregate; Spain 16 - Italy 6
 Spain promoted to division 1

Bibliography 
 Francesco Volpe, Valerio Vecchiarelli (2000), 2000 Italia in Meta, Storia della nazionale italiana di rugby dagli albori al Sei Nazioni, GS Editore (2000) 
 Francesco Volpe, Paolo Pacitti (Author), Rugby 2000, GTE Gruppo Editorale (1999).

References

External links
 FIRA-AER official website

1971–72 in European rugby union
1971-72
1971 rugby union tournaments for national teams
1972 rugby union tournaments for national teams